Ida or IDA may refer to:

Astronomy
Ida Facula, a mountain on Amalthea, a moon of Jupiter
243 Ida, an asteroid
International Docking Adapter, a docking adapter for the International Space Station

Computing
Intel Dynamic Acceleration, a technology for increasing single-threaded performance on multi-core processors
Interactive Disassembler (now IDA Pro), a popular software disassembler tool for reverse engineering
Interactive Data Analysis, a software package for SPSS
Interchange of Data across Administrations (IDA), a predecessor programme to the IDABC in European eGovernment

Film and television
ID:A, a 2011 Danish film
Ida (film), a 2013 Polish film
Ida Galaxy, a fictional galaxy in the Stargate TV series

Greek mythology
Ida (mother of Minos), daughter of Corybas, the wife of Lycastus king of Crete, and the mother of the "second" king Minos of Crete
Ida (nurse of Zeus), who along with her sister Adrasteia, nursed Zeus on Crete
Mount Ida, a sacred mountain

Music
Ida (band), a U.S. indie rock group
Ida (singer), a Danish singer on X Factor

Names
Ida (given name), including people so named
Ida (surname), a list of people so named

Organizations
In Defense of Animals, a non-profit organization for animal rights activism
Indian Dental Association
IDA Ireland, formerly the Industrial Development Authority
Infocomm Development Authority of Singapore, a statutory board of the Singapore government
Information Design Association
 or Danish Society of Engineers, an association for engineers and others in technology
Institute for Defense Analyses, a U.S. non-profit corporation that administers three federally funded research and development centers
International Dark-Sky Association, a U.S.-based non-profit organization
International Depositary Authority, established by the Budapest Treaty for the deposit the biological material for the recognition of patents, such as the Microbial Culture Collection
International Desalination Association, a global organization dedicated to desalination, desalination technology and water reuse
International Development Association of the World Bank
International Disability Alliance, an international alliance of individuals to defend the rights of those with disabilities
International Dispensary Association Foundation a NGO dedicated to improving access to medications in the developing world
International Documentary Association, a non-profit organization promoting documentary film, video and new media
International Dyslexia Association, a non-profit education and advocacy organization
Investment Dealers Association of Canada, now part of the Investment Industry Regulatory Organization of Canada
Issues Deliberation Australia/America, a public policy think tank based in South Australia and Texas

Places
Ida Ridge, British Columbia, Canada
Ida, a community in Cavan–Monaghan Township, Ontario, Canada
Ida (barony), a barony in County Kilkenny, Ireland
Ida, Nigeria, a railway station in Nigeria
Ida (river), Slovakia
Ida, Eastern Cape, a town in South Africa near Otto Du Plessis Pass
Ida Valley, a locality in Central Otago, New Zealand
Ida, Vologda Oblast, Russia
Ida, Russia, a list of rural localities

United States
Ida, Arkansas, an unincorporated community
Ida, Kentucky, an unincorporated community
Ida, Louisiana, a village
Ida County, Iowa
Ida Township, Michigan
Ida, Michigan
Ida Township, Douglas County, Minnesota
Ida Lake, Shelby Township, Blue Earth County, Minnesota
Ida, Virginia, an unincorporated community
Ida., one of the abbreviations of Idaho

Science
Ida (plant), a genus in the family Orchidaceae
IDA*, an iterative deepening depth-first search algorithm
Iminodiacetic acid, a dicarboxylic acid amine
Incremental Dynamic Analysis, a method for assessing the seismic behavior of structures
Industrial Denatured Alcohol
Intradural anesthesia or spinal anaesthesia
Iron-deficiency anemia
Isotope dilution analysis
Ida, a fossil of the early primate genus Darwinius, species Darwinius masillae

Other uses
List of storms named Ida
Mount Ida, disambiguation page
I.D.A. (drug store), originally Independent Druggists' Alliance, a Canadian drug store
Ila (Hinduism) or Idā, a Vedic goddess
Ida (Middleverse), a fictional android librarian in comic books
Ida (sword), a type of sword used by the Yoruba people
Ida (yoga), a Nadi in Indian medicine and yoga
USS Ida (1863), a Union Navy steamer of the American Civil War
Individual Development Account, an asset building tool for low-income families
Princess Ida, the comic opera's eponymous fictional heroine
Idaho Falls Regional Airport's IATA airport code
Idaxo-Isuxa-Tiriki language's ISO 639-3 code

See also
Idas (disambiguation)
Ita (disambiguation)
Itta (592–652), wife of Pepin of Landen and mother of Saint Begga